are a group of historic sites that played an important part in the industrialization of Japan in the Bakumatsu and Meiji periods (1850s - 1910), and are part of the industrial heritage of Japan. In 2009 the monuments were submitted jointly for inscription on the UNESCO World Heritage List under criteria ii, iii, and iv. The sites were accepted at the 39th UNESCO World Heritage session, under the condition to take measures "that allow an understanding that there were a large number of Koreans and others who were brought against their will and forced to work under harsh conditions(...)", and again, such measures have yet to be implemented.

Eight areas are registered, with twenty-three component sites:

Area 1: Hagi in Yamaguchi
Hagi proto-industrial sites and Tokugawa period cultural setting; Hagi, Yamaguchi Prefecture:

Area 2: Kagoshima
Shūseikan pioneering factory complex; Kagoshima, Kagoshima Prefecture:

Area 3: Nirayama in Shizuoka
Nirayama proto-industrial reverberatory furnace; Izunokuni, Shizuoka Prefecture:

Area 4: Kamaishi in Iwate
Hashino iron mining and smelting site; Kamaishi, Iwate Prefecture:

Area 5: Saga
Mietsu shipyard; Saga, Saga Prefecture:

Area 6: Nagasaki
Nagasaki shipyard facilities, coal mining islands and associated sites; Nagasaki, Nagasaki Prefecture:

Area 7: Miike in Fukuoka and Kumamoto
Miike coal mines, railway and ports; Ōmuta, Fukuoka Prefecture, Arao and Uki, Kumamoto Prefecture:

Area 8: Yahata in Fukuoka
Yawata steel works; Kitakyūshū and Nakama, Fukuoka Prefecture:

Controversy

The inclusion of some of these properties as UNESCO Heritage sites arraised concerns and objections from South Korea, on the grounds that conscripted Korean civilians and Chinese prisoners-of-war were forced to work under harsh conditions at seven of these sites during Japan's World War II mobilization policies. There is a research questioning about Japanese government's compliance with UNESCO regulations and requirements with respect to Hashima Coal Mine site.

Although the period at which forced labour took place does not coincide with the period of Meiji industrial revolution, the criticism arose based on the view that the Meiji industrial revolution was 'inseparable from 20th-century empire-building, which led inexorably to Japanese colonialism and the Asia-Pacific War'. South Korea claimed that the official recognition of those sites would "violate the dignity of the survivors of forced labor as well as the spirit and principles of the UNESCO Convention", and "World Heritage sites should be of outstanding universal value and be acceptable by all peoples across the globe." China also released a similar statement that “World Heritage application should live up to the principle and spirit of promoting peace as upheld by UNESCO.”

See also
 World Heritage Sites in Japan
 Hidden Christian Sites in the Nagasaki Region

References

External links
 UNESCO Tentative List entry
 The Modern Industrial Heritage Sites in Kyushu and Yamaguchi
 Emergence of Industrial Japan: Kyushu and Yamaguchi
 The Modern Industrial Heritage Sites in Kyushu and Yamaguchi 
 Industrial Heritage Information Center 

Anti-Japanese sentiment in Korea
Bakumatsu
Meiji period
Fukuoka Prefecture
Kagoshima Prefecture
Kumamoto Prefecture
Nagasaki Prefecture
Saga Prefecture
Yamaguchi Prefecture
Industrial archaeology
World Heritage Sites in Japan